Rashba may refer to:

 Shlomo ibn Aderet (1235–1310), medieval Jewish rabbi
 Solomon ben Abraham of Montpellier, medieval Jewish rabbi, called "Rashba of the mountain"
 Emmanuel Rashba, condensed matter physicist
 Rashba effect, a spin-orbit coupling mechanism named after Emmanuel Rashba.

See also
 Rashbam